Donald Knight (16 February 1933 – 18 August 1997) was an English-born film, television, and stage actor. He worked largely in the United States, and often played tough guys.

Early life
Born in Manchester, Lancashire, he served a short stint in the British Army, and shortly afterward left England for Canada. Knight began acting at the age of seven. He studied at Sir George Williams University in Montreal, Quebec, and later at Wesley Theological Seminary in Washington, D.C. He obtained degrees in English, philosophy, theology, and drama.

Acting career
In 1965, he moved to California to pursue acting, and was primarily a character actor, making numerous guest appearances in television series such as Combat!, The Time Tunnel, Bewitched, Hogan's Heroes, The Big Valley, Hawaii Five-O, It Takes a Thief, Bonanza, Mannix, Mission: Impossible, Columbo, Banacek, Night Gallery, Cannon, Kojak, Little House on the Prairie, and Barnaby Jones, as well as semi-regular roles in series such as The Immortal.

In 1976, he was in the Disney film Treasure of Matecumbe. His character was Skaggs.

He appeared in the PBS telefilm The Canterville Ghost. Its other distributors were WonderWorks and the Disney Channel.

Personal life and death
Educated in theology, Knight became an ordained minister in 1956. During his acting career, he sometimes served as a church pastor. He was a minister at the United Church of Christ in Simi Valley, California.

Knight died on 18 August 1997 in Squaw Valley, Fresno County, California, USA, following a stroke earlier that month.

Filmography

References

External links
 
 Actor Don Knight

1933 births
1997 deaths
United Church of Christ ministers
Male actors from Manchester
English male film actors
English male stage actors
English male television actors
Sir George Williams University alumni
Wesley Theological Seminary alumni
20th-century British Army personnel
20th-century English male actors